The 2022 Lao League is the 33rd season of the Lao League 1. Contested by 7 clubs, it operates on a system of promotion and relegation with the Lao League 2. The season started on 12 March 2022. It is played in triple round-robin format, with 21 total rounds. Due to the new policies and regulations implemented by the newly established Laos Football League Company, there will be only seven teams in the league.

FC Chanthabouly were the defending champions, having won their title in 2020 season. However, they did not send a team due to problems with the Lao National Football Federation.

Team 
A total of 7 teams participated in the 2022 Lao League season.

Stadium
Note: Table lists in alphabetical order.

Changes from last season

Team changes

Withdrew
A total of 7 teams participated in the 2022 Lao League season, 1 promoted from the previous season of Lao League 2. 1 teams withdrew from the league, including defending champions, Chanthabouly after winning the 2021 season due to Laos match fixing scandal.
Chanthabuly

Personnel, kit and sponsoring
Note: Flags indicate national team as has been defined under FIFA eligibility rules. Players may hold more than one non-FIFA nationality.

Managerial changes

Foreign players
The number of foreign players is restricted to four per team. A team can use four foreign players on the field in each game, including at least one player from the AFC region.

Players name in bold indicates the player is registered during the mid-season transfer window.

League table

Results

Match 1

Match 2

Match 3

Match 4

Match 5

Match 6

Awards
The best player:
Kydavone Souvanny (Young Elephants)
The scoring:
Keoviengphet Liththideth (Master 7)
The best goalkeeper:
Outthilath Nammakhoth (Young Elephants)

Top scorers

1 own goal
 Kittisak Phomvongsa (against Master 7 FC)
1 own goal
 Bounmy Jittaphon (against Viengchanh FC)

See also
 2022 Lao League 2
 2022 LFF Lao  Cup
 2022 LFF National Championship

References

External links
Lao Premier League website

Laos
Lao Premier League seasons
2022 in Laotian football